Home media refers to media used for recording, copying, delivery, and playback of various types of entertainment and information in the home.

Forms of home media include:
 Home video 
 Magnetic tape
 Phonograph record

See also
 Home Media Magazine, a former trade publication that covered various aspects of the home entertainment industry